Parali Thermal Power Plant is located at Parali Vaijnath in Beed district of Maharashtra. The power plant is one of the coal based power plants of Maharashtra State Power Generation Company (Mahagenco).

Installed Capacity

References

External links
 Parli TPS

Coal-fired power stations in Maharashtra
Beed district
1971 establishments in Maharashtra
Energy infrastructure completed in 1971
20th-century architecture in India